{{Infobox road
|country = IRL
|type = N
|route = 11
|length_km = 129.07 
|destinations = (bypassed routes in italics)
 Dún Laoghaire–Rathdown
 Stillorgan
 Foxrock
 Cabinteely
 Shankill
 County Wicklow
 Bray
 Greystones
 Kilmacanogue
 Kilpedder
 Newtownmountkennedy
 Ashford
 Rathnew
 Arklow
 County Wexford
 Inch
 Gorey
 Clogh Camolin
 Ferns
 Enniscorthy
 Oilgate
 Wexford Town
|e-road = 
}}

The N11 road is a national primary road in Ireland, running for  along the east side of Ireland from Dublin to Wexford. It passes close to Bray, Greystones, Wicklow, Arklow, Gorey, and Enniscorthy. Beyond Wexford, the route continues to Rosslare as the N25. The road forms part of European route E01. As of July 2019 the N11/M11 is of dual carriageway or motorway standard from Dublin as far as Oilgate in County Wexford.

The road is a busy commuter route, being the only dual carriageway passing through the south eastern suburbs of Dublin, as well as close to the many commuter towns along the east coast as far south as Gorey. Summer Friday and Sunday evenings also see very heavy traffic as Dubliners decamp to and return from their many holiday home locations along the Co. Wicklow and Co. Wexford coastlines.

Original route out of and into Dublin
The N11 commenced where it met the N4 on the south end of O'Connell Bridge in Dublin city centre. The route proceeded along D'Olier Street, College Street (and in the opposite direction, Westmoreland Street). The route continued around College Green and Grafton Street (and in the other direction, Suffolk Street, Church Lane and Dame Street). From here, the route continued out of the city via Nassau Street, Kildare Street, North side of St. Stephen's Green, Merrion Row, Baggot Street Lower, Pembroke Street Lower, Fitzwilliam Square West and Pembroke Street Upper. This route section in the other direction (into the city centre) ran via Leeson Street Lower, East and North sides of St. Stephen's Green and Dawson Street. The N11 ran in both directions along Leeson Street Lower after the junction with Pembroke Street. Having crossed the Grand Canal the route divided again for a portion of Leeson Street Upper, with outbound traffic proceeding via Sussex Road. The route continued via Morehampton Road and Donnybrook Road, through Donnybrook. Eventually converting from single carriageway (including bus lanes either side) to dual carriageway at Donnybrook Church, which marks the beginning of what is known as the Stillorgan Road.

The Stillorgan Road brought the road past Belfield, where University College Dublin is located (and accessed from a grade-separated interchange on the dual carriageway - the first full interchange built in Ireland) and onwards to its junction with Mount Merrion Avenue.

This former section of the N11 is now the R138.

Current starting point
Heading south, the N11 currently starts in Mount Merrion at the junction with the N31 to Dún Laoghaire harbour.

From this junction it heads south to Stillorgan village. Stillorgan village is bypassed to the east by the N11 dual carriageway, which proceeds southeast through Galloping Green, bypassing Leopardstown and Foxrock to the east also. Then the Cabinteely Bypass and part of the Bray Road bring the N11 via Loughlinstown to north of Shankill, where the M11 motorway' commences as the Bray/Shankill Bypass.

The entire length of the N11, from Mount Merrion to the Loughlinstown roundabout, is provided with a Quality Bus Corridor (QBC) bus lane. Dublin Bus Route 46A operates over this stretch of road as far as the junction with Kill Lane in Foxrock.

Link with M50
Along the Shankill Bypass, the M11 is joined by the Dublin's M50 motorway partial ring road, which terminates at a major junction along the M11, which opened in June 2005. This link allows motorists to drive on continuous motorway and dual carriageway from Oilegate, Co. Wexford to various destinations around the island via the M50 and the national roads it serves. These include Portlaoise via the N7/M7, Newry, County Down via the M1/N1/A1, north of Ashbourne, County Meath via the N2, Galway, County Galway via the M4/N4/M6, and Mullingar, County Westmeath via the N4/M4.

Traffic proceeding north on the M11 is given a choice to stay on the main carriageway (which becomes the M50), or take the exit at what is junction 17 on the M50, in order to stay on the M11, following the N11 and the R138 into the city centre.

Route through Wicklow and Wexford
West of Bray in County Wicklow, the motorway ends, with the N11 continuing south as dual carriageway through the Glen of the Downs. The upgrading of the road to dual carriageway through the Glen of the Downs was controversial, as the valley is a wooded area. Expanding the road resulted in the removal of some woodland. A campaign of protests, mainly by environmental activists, led to long delays in the construction of this section of road, but the work was eventually completed with a minimal disruption to the woodland. After Glen of the Downs the N11 continues south to bypass Kilpedder and Newtownmountkennedy.  The road becomes the M11 again at Junction 14 and bypasses Ashford, Rathnew and Arklow (which was bypassed by a dual-carriageway route opened in January 1999 and re-designated as motorway in August 2009). 

thumb|M11 south of Wicklow town

Just north of Inch, the M11 enters County Wexford. The route continues South, bypassing Gorey and Clogh. This section was also re-designated as motorway from 28 August 2009. The former N11 road between Newtownmountkennedy and Gorey is now signposted as the R772 regional road. The M11 then bypasses Camolin, Ferns and Enniscorthy. At Ballydawmore, about 4.25 km east-northeast of Enniscorthy, the N30 from New Ross, which also connects to the N80 from Tullamore at Clavass about 5 km north of Enniscorthy, meets the M11 at a junction, which also connects to R744 road. At the end of the Enniscorthy Bypass the motorway section ends at the Scurlocksbush roundabout. The N11 then continues as a single carriageway. South of here, the N11 passes through Oilegate, County Wexford, continuing south through Ferrycarrig, and crossing the River Slaney to terminate on a bypass west of Wexford where it meets the N25 from Waterford at the Ballindinas roundabout.

Upgrades
The N11 has been gradually upgraded from single to dual carriageway standard from the 1950s to the present, with improvements taking place at an accelerated pace in recent years. The first short stretch of dual carriageway on the road, and the first stretch of dual carriageway in the Republic of Ireland, was built in the 1950s between the Stillorgan Road/Newtownpark Avenue junction (White's Cross) and Foxrock Church (this stretch was substantially widened around the turn of the millennium). Subsequent short stretches of dual carriageway, at Loughlinstown, between Bray and Kilpedder, and from Donnybrook to Stillorgan were constructed during the early to mid-1970s, this phase ending with the opening of the Stillorgan bypass in October 1977. Since that time, these sections have been joined up through further improvements.

Timeline (from 1970)
 1970: Kilcroney dual carriageway (with at grade junctions) from Fassaroe to Kilmacanogue, west of Bray. 3 km.
 1972: Kilpedder bypass; dual carriageway (with at grade junctions) but including one road underpass, the first "flyover" in Ireland. 2 km.
 1974: Belfield flyover; a stretch of six-lane dual carriageway with a GSJ at the entrance to UCD, Belfield. 2 km (now part of the R138 regional road)
 1976: Extensions of the Belfield section in both directions with six-lane dc, at grade, with multiple residential access points. 2 km. (now part of the R138 regional road)
 1977: Stillorgan bypass. At grade 4 lane dual carriageway with hard shoulder from Fosters Avenue to White's Cross, replacing earlier 1950s dual carriageway at Galloping Green. 3 km.
 1984: Cabinteely and Cornelscourt bypass. At grade 4 lane dual carriageway with hard shoulder. 2 km.
 1986: Old 1950s dual carriageway replaced by at grade 4 lane dual carriageway with hard shoulder between White's Cross and the Cabinteely bypass. 1 km.
 1990: Newtownmountkennedy bypass. Four lane dual carriageway with hard shoulders and GSJ. 5 km.
 1991: M11 Bray-Shankill bypass. Motorway from the 1960s Loughlinstown dual carriageway to the Kilcroney (1970) dual carriageway. 5 km.
 1993: Fassaroe Bridge; grade separated junction created at the end of the M11/start of Kilcroney dual carriageway.
 1995: Ram Bridge; grade separated junction created linking the N11 to the southern end of Bray.
 1999: Arklow bypass; fully grade separated dual carriageway (re-classified as motorway in 2009). 10 km.
 2003: Glen of the Downs dual carriageway joining the dual carriageway north of Kilmacanogue to the 1972 Kilpedder bypass. 5 km.
 2004: New dual carriageway replaced the 1960s Loughlinstown dual carriageway'' and included a grade separated junction with the R118. 3 km.
 2004: Ashford/Rathnew bypass; fully grade separated dual carriageway (partially re-classified as motorway in 2009). 14 km.
 2007: Gorey bypass; fully grade separated dual carriageway (re-classified as motorway in 2009). 22 km.
 2008: Grade separated junction created on the Kilpedder bypass (1972) to link with the new R774 dual carriageway to Greystones.
 2015: Arklow-Rathnew; motorway from Rathnew to Arklow. Officially opened to traffic on 13 July 2015. 14 km 
 2019: Enniscorthy bypass; motorway from Clogh to Scurlocksbush, also connecting the M11 to the N30 and the N80. Officially opened to traffic on 18 July 2019. 27 km Since it was completed in 2019, dual carriageway or motorway extends from Donnybrook near central Dublin (R138) to north of Oilgate in County Wexford.

Initial planning is underway to bypass Oilgate by building a new dual carriageway N11 from the end of the current M11 Enniscorthy bypass to the N25 near Wexford Town. A new section of N25 will complete the up-grade of Euroroute 01 between the M50 and Rosslare Harbour.

If this project was completed as planned, there would be no single carriageway sections of the N11 left.

On 30 September 2008, the Department of Transport proposed that the dual carriageway sections from Ashford to south of Rathnew, and from north of Arklow to south of Gorey, be reclassified as motorway under the Roads Act 2007. The Statutory Instrument for these reclassifications was passed on 2 July 2009 and came into effect on 28 August 2009.  There are two sections of M11 motorway forming part of the N11 route.

Exit list

See also

Roads in Ireland
National secondary road
Regional road

References

11
Roads in County Dublin
Roads in County Wicklow
Roads in County Wexford